Headquarters and Offices

The URAC offices are located in Washington, DC at 1220 L Street, NW. URAC is in the heart of the city, close to the White House, the Capitol and congressional offices and major transportation hubs. About half of URAC staff members work from the Washington, DC office and half work from home offices around the United States.

Accreditation Programs and Application Process

URAC’s accreditation programs include specialty pharmacy, digital health, utilization management, health plan, case management and many others across the health care spectrum. URAC’s accreditation programs require organizations to demonstrate how they meet standards set by experts in health care in the areas of patient management, pharmacy product handling, patient communications, credentialing of providers, review timelines, and patient safety and security. In order to earn an accreditation, organizations must submit a variety of policies and procedures which are reviewed by a URAC accreditation reviewer (a nurse or pharmacist). Following this review, applications are blinded and given to URAC’s Accreditation Committee for review. Most organizations complete the accreditation process is about a year.

ACCREDITATION PROGRAMS

URAC offers accreditation programs for health care organizations throughout the industry, with a focus on pharmacies, health plans and digital health. URAC’s 1,100-plus clients comprise leaders in health care who rely on accreditation to signify their commitment to the highest quality health care.

URAC offers almost 50 accreditation and certification programs in six key specialty areas: 

 Pharmacy 
 Patient Care Management 
 Administrative Management 
 Digital Health and Telehealth 
 Health Plan 
 Mental Health and Substance Use Disorder Parity 

URAC’s accreditation and certification programs:

 Case Management
 Clinically Integrated Network
 Community Pharmacy
 Contact Center Certification
 Credentials Verification Organization
 Dental Network
 Dental Plan
 Disease Management
 Drug Therapy Management
 Employer-Based Population Health
 Health Call Center
 Health Care Management Certification
 Health Content Provider Certification
 Health Network
 Health Plan
 Health Plan with Long-Term Services and Supports
 Health Utilization Management
 Health Website Accreditation
 Independent Medical Examination
 Independent Review Organization
 Infusion Pharmacy
 Integrated Behavioral Health Designation
 Mail Service Pharmacy
 Marketplace Health Plan
 Measurement-Based Care Designation
 Medicaid Health Plan
 Medicaid with Long-Term Services and Supports
 Medicare Advantage
 Medicare Home Infusion Therapy Supplier
 Mental Health Parity
 Opioid Stewardship Designation
 Patient-Centered Medical Home Certification
 Pharmacy Benefit Management
 Provider-Based Population Health
 Rare Disease Designation
 Remote Patient Monitoring
 Small Health Plan
 Small Mail Service Pharmacy
 Small Specialty Pharmacy
 Specialty Pharmacy
 Specialty Pharmacy Services
 Specialty Physician Practice Dispensing
 Telehealth
 Telehealth Support Services Certification
 Transitions Of Care Designation
 Workers’ Compensation and Property & Casualty Pharmacy Benefit Management
 Workers’ Compensation Utilization Management

References

External links
  

Healthcare accreditation organizations in the United States
Health insurance in the United States
Quality assurance organizations
Medical and health organizations based in Washington, D.C.